Ava Liu Yu-Kiu (born 5 August 1985) is a Hong Kong singer, actress and television host.

Early life
Ava was born and raised in Hong Kong, where her junior primary studies were at the Cheung Chau Primary School, because her mother was a primary school teacher, Ava transferred to St. Clare's Primary School to continue her primary studies. Her secondary studies were at the Ying Wa Girls' School.

In 2002, Ava scored 26 points at the HKCEE Examination, then she was admitted to the University of Hong Kong, majoring in biology, where she graduated in 2007 and attained ABRSM grade eight piano certificate.

Career
In 2009, Ava became a newcomer of Hong Kong's music industry; she previously released her singles including "HKU girls", "Private affair official handle", and "Treat you worse just want you afraid". In July, she launched her photo album at the Hong Kong Book Fair, which was shot in Sabah, Malaysia. At the end of same year, she launched her first personal album "AVA".

Ava is now hosting a radio program at the network radio station with Shiu Tin Yi and Lam Chi To. In addition, she is sharing her beauty tips on YouTube; she posts her videos non-regularly.

At the end of 2013, the movie "Lan Kwai Fong 3" was released. Ava as the lead actress, and her performance in the film made her rise in popularity.

Personal life
Ava married singer-songwriter Adason Lo (羅力威) in Repulse Bay on March 31, 2018. The couple had been dating for seven years.

Discography

Studio albums

Filmography

Film

Television

Drama
 MicroSex Office

References

External links

1985 births
Living people
Hong Kong film actresses
Alumni of the University of Hong Kong
21st-century Hong Kong women singers